The McDougall–Campbell House is an English Arts and Crafts-Style house in Portland, Oregon, United States.  It has elements of the English Cottage style incorporated into the design.  The house was designed by architect Josef Jacobberger for Gilbert H. Durham and built in 1910 or earlier.

Dominant are characteristics of the Arts and Crafts Movement, including use of natural materials (wood, brick, tile, stone), built-in cabinetry, shingles, a variety of window types, asymmetrical floor plans, multiple steeply pitched gables, an open porch, brick chimneys and rooms with an open flow extending to the exterior.

Important are elements of the English Cottage style including the eyebrow dormer, wrought iron work and the jerkinhead or clipped gable that is an architectural feature whose origins trace back to the thatched roof of Medieval England.

Landscaping contributes to the setting of the McDougall–Campbell House.  Trees, shrubs, stone steps, lawn areas, walkways, a terracotta tiled patio, and terraces make up the yard, which is informal, overgrown and reminiscent of an English garden.  A rock retaining wall runs the length of the property.

References

Portland City Directory (1913 edition)

Morning Oregonian (Portland Oregon) September 3, 1914,
Historic Oregon Newspapers,
oregonnews.uoregon.edu

Architectural Plans for Mr. G. H. Durham by Jos. Jacobberger and Alfred H.Smith,
University of Oregon, Eugene, Oregon,
Jacobberger Collection,
Knight Library

External links

Houses on the National Register of Historic Places in Portland, Oregon
Houses completed in 1910
1910 establishments in Oregon
Joseph Jacobberger buildings
Northwest Portland, Oregon